Kensington Oval is a sports stadium in Bridgetown, Barbados. The ground is used mainly for cricket and has been the venue for international matches featuring the West Indies cricket team. It was established as the home ground of Pickwick Cricket Club in 1882 and hosted the West Indies first home Test match in 1930. International sides played at the ground as early as 1895, and the ground was the first at which a combined West Indies side played first-class cricket.

One Day Internationals (ODI) have been played on the ground since 1985 and Twenty20 Internationals since 2008. The ground was rebuilt ahead of the 2007 Cricket World Cup and hosted the tournament final as well as the final of the 2010 ICC World Twenty20. Women's ODI and T20I matches have been held at the ground since 2010 and it hosted the final of the 2010 ICC Women's World Twenty20 competition.

In cricket, a five-wicket haul (also known as a "five-for" or "fifer") refers to a bowler taking five or more wickets in a single innings. This is regarded as a notable achievement. This article details the five-wicket hauls taken on the ground in official international Test, One Day International and Twenty20 International matches.

The first five-wicket hauls in international matches on the ground were taken by England's Greville Stevens who took five wickets in each innings of the ground's first Test match in 1930. The first West Indian to do so was fast bowler Manny Martindale who took five wickets for 22 runs (5/22) against England in 1935. South African Charl Langeveldt took the first five-wicket haul in a One Day International on the ground, taking 5/62 against West Indies in 2005, a haul which included a hat-trick. West Indian Anisa Mohammed took the first five-wicket haul by a woman on the ground in an ODI in 2012 and the following year took the grounds first T20I five-wicket haul.

Key

Test match five-wicket hauls

A total of 60 five-wicket hauls have been taken in Test matches on the ground.

One Day International five-wicket hauls

There have been seven five-wicket hauls taken in ODIs on the ground.

Men's matches

Women's matches

Twenty20 International five-wicket hauls

Three five-wicket hauls have been taken in T20I matches on the ground, all of them in women's matches.

Notes

References

External links
International five-wicket hauls at Kensington Oval, CricInfo

Kensington Oval
Kensington Oval